Marinella - I megaliteres epitihies tis (Greek: Μαρινέλλα - Οι μεγαλύτερες επιτυχίες της) is a compilation of recordings by popular Greek singer Marinella, under the Minos EMI series I Megaliteres Epitihies (Greatest hits). This album is part of the compilation. It was released in November, 2001 in Greece and includes 16 studio recordings by Marinella from 1988 - 1995 for the Minos EMI.

Track listing 
 "Tolmo" - (Alexis Papadimitriou-Evi Droutsa) - (Τολμώ; I dare)
 This song had been released on Tolmo.
 "Thelo na t' akouo" - (Takis Mousafiris) - (Θέλω να τ' ακούω; I want to hear it)
 This song had been released on Lege Mou "S' agapo".
 "Ise mia thiella" - (Alexis Papadimitriou-Evi Droutsa) - (Είσαι μια θύελλα; You're a storm)
 This song had been released on Eisai Mia Thiella.
"Pali berdeftika (Salma ya salama)" - (Sayed Darwish-Salah Jahin-Pierre Delanoë-Jeff Barnel-Evi Droutsa) - (Πάλι μπερδεύτηκα; I'm confused, again)
 This song had been released on I Marinella Tragouda Megales Kyries.
 "Se yirevo pantou" - (Giorgos Niarchos-Thanos Sofos) - (Σε γυρεύω παντού; I'm looking everywhere for you)
 This song had been released on Eisai Mia Thiella.
 "Tris i ora" - (Thanasis Polykandriotis-Ifigeneia Giannopoulou) - (Τρεις η ώρα;Three o'clock p.m.)
 This song had been released on To Ximeroma Tou Erota.
 "Koursa thanatou" (in duet with Yiannis Parios) - (Alexis Papadimitriou-Evi Droutsa) - (Κούρσα θανάτου; Death race)
 This song had been released on Tolmo.
 "Prova nifikou" - (Vassilis Dimitriou) - (Πρόβα νυφικού; Fitting of the wedding dress)
 This song had been released on I Prova Tou Nifikou.
 "Emeis teriazoume" - (Giorgos Niarchos-Thanos Sofos) - (Εμείς ταιριάζουμε; We match)
 This song had been released on Tolmo.
 "Mesa s' ena tango" - (Vassilis Dimitriou) - (Μέσα σ' ένα τανγκό; In a tango)
 This song had been released on I Prova Tou Nifikou.
 "To ximeroma tou erota" - (Thanasis Polykandriotis-Ifigeneia Giannopoulou) - (Το ξημέρωμα του έρωτα; The dawn of love)
 This song had been released on To Ximeroma Tou Erota.
 "Treli" - (Vassilis Dimitriou) - (Τρελή; Crazy)
 This song had been released on I Prova Tou Nifikou.
 "Esy mou fernis tichi (Cuando salí de Cuba)" - (Luis Aguilé-Gian Pieretti-Giovanni Saugust-Evi Droutsa) - (Εσύ μου φέρνεις τύχη; You bring me luck)
 This song had been released on I Marinella Tragouda Megales Kyries.
 "Ti ekana gia parti mou" - (Thanasis Polykandriotis-Fotini Dourou) - (Τι έκανα για πάρτη μου; What did I do for myself)
 This song had been released on To Ximeroma Tou Erota.
 "Paradigmatos charin" - (Alexis Papadimitriou-Evi Droutsa) - 2:43 - (Παραδείγματος χάριν; For example)
 This song had been released on Tolmo.
 "Ah ke na ginomoun i agapi sou" - (Giorgos Niarchos-Argiro Sofou) - (Αχ και να γινόμουν η αγάπη σου; If only I became your love)
 This song had been released on Tolmo.

Personnel 
 Marinella - vocals, background vocals
 Yiannis Parios - vocals
 Argiris Koukas - background vocals on "Ti ekana gia parti mou"
 Haris Andreadis – arranger, conductor
 Vassilis Dimitriou - arranger and conductor on tracks 8, 10, 12
 Takis Mousafiris - arranger and conductor on "Thelo na t' akouo"
 Minos EMI - producer

References

2001 greatest hits albums
Greek-language albums
Marinella compilation albums
EMI Records albums
Minos EMI albums